Thomas Oysten Farrage (3 November 1917 – 23 September 1944) was an English professional footballer who played in the Football League for Birmingham. He was killed in action during the Second World War.

Life and career
Farrage was born in Chopwell, near Rowlands Gill, which was then in County Durham, to Robert and Isabella Farrage. He began his football career with Walker Celtic in the North Eastern League, and joined First Division club Birmingham in November 1937. Described as a "promising young player with an eye for goal", Farrage made his debut on 7 September 1938 in a 2–1 win at home to Leicester City, and kept his place for five of the next six games, in which he scored twice. He played once more that season, and in the opening three games of the 1939–40 season which was abandoned because of the Second World War.

He made guest appearances for Leeds United, Luton Town and Middlesbrough in the wartime leagues, though he did not play again for Birmingham.

Farrage was a member of the Royal Army Service Corps (RASC) (his last station was at Dover) until May 1943, when he commenced training with the Parachute Regiment. He was killed in action on 23 September 1944 by German machine-gun fire in Arnhem (see the Battle of Arnhem), serving as a private in the 10th Battalion, Parachute Regiment during Operation Market Garden, and is commemorated on the Groesbeek Memorial.

Notes

References

External links
 Thomas Farrage's details at the Commonwealth War Graves Commission

1917 births
1944 deaths
People from Rowlands Gill
Footballers from Tyne and Wear
English footballers
Association football forwards
Walker Celtic F.C. players
Birmingham City F.C. players
English Football League players
Leeds United F.C. wartime guest players
Luton Town F.C. wartime guest players
Middlesbrough F.C. wartime guest players
British Army personnel killed in World War II
British Parachute Regiment soldiers
Royal Army Service Corps soldiers
Military personnel from County Durham
Operation Market Garden